Kye A'Hern (born May 24, 2001) is a professional downhill mountain bike racer from Australia. In 2019 he won the Junior Men's Downhill Mountain biking World championships in Mont-Sainte-Anne, Canada.

References

2001 births
Living people
Australian mountain bikers